Lac-Blanc is an unorganized territory in the Capitale-Nationale region of Quebec, Canada, in the north-east of the Portneuf Regional County Municipality. This unorganized territory covers 567.80 km ². The main lake, designated "White Lake" has the shape of a fine, oriented north–south. The discharge of this lake is on the southern tip, where it flows into the White River.

Demography

Private dwellings occupied by usual residents in 2011: 0 (total dwellings: 214)

Toponymy 
All of the following toponyms are related and are registered at the Bank of places names of Commission de toponymie du Québec:
 "Unorganized territory of Lac-Blanc", registered on March 13, 1986,
 "Zec de la Rivière-Blanche", registered on August 5, 1982,
 "Rivière Blanche", registered on December 5, 1968,
 "Lac Blanc", the largest water body of the "Unorganized territory of Lac-Blanc", registered on December 5, 1968.

See also 
 White River
 Rivière-à-Pierre, municipality
 Batiscanie, Quebec
 Batiscan River
 Portneuf Wildlife Reserve
 Laurentides Wildlife Reserve
 Portneuf Regional County Municipality
 Zec de la Rivière-Blanche

References

Unorganized territories in Capitale-Nationale